Miller 500 may refer to:

 Miller 500 (Busch race), at Martinsville Speedway from 1986 to 1987 and 1992 to 1994
 Miller 500 (Pocono), at Pocono Raceway in 1996
 Miller 500 (Dover), at Dover International Speedway from 1996 to 1997

See also
 Miller High Life 500 (disambiguation)